First Baptist Church, is a historic Baptist church located at 401 Oakhurst Street in Kernersville, Forsyth County, North Carolina.  It was built in 1915–1916, and is a two-story cross-gabled brick building, with Gothic Revival and Tudor Revival style design elements.  It has a cross-gable roof, three-stage corner entrance tower, and retains original furnishings.

It was listed on the National Register of Historic Places in 1988.

References

Baptist churches in North Carolina
Churches on the National Register of Historic Places in North Carolina
Gothic Revival church buildings in North Carolina
Tudor Revival architecture in North Carolina
Churches completed in 1916
20th-century Baptist churches in the United States
Churches in Forsyth County, North Carolina
National Register of Historic Places in Forsyth County, North Carolina